Maggie Summit is a summit in the U.S. state of Nevada.

Maggie Summit takes its name from nearby Maggie Creek.

References

Mountains of Elko County, Nevada